Lance Reginald Sherrell  (born 9 February 1966) is a South African former rugby union player.

Playing career
In 1994 he toured with the Springboks to New Zealand. Sherrell did not play in any test matches but played in six tour matches, scoring 31 points, including three tries, for the Springboks.

See also
List of South Africa national rugby union players – Springbok no. 613

References

1966 births
Living people
South African rugby union players
South Africa international rugby union players
Golden Lions players
Western Province (rugby union) players
Sharks (Currie Cup) players
Blue Bulls players
Alumni of St Stithians College
Rugby union players from Durban
Rugby union fly-halves